Parthenina juliae is a species of sea snail, a marine gastropod mollusk in the family Pyramidellidae, the pyrams and their allies.

Distribution
This species occurs in the following locations:
 European waters (ERMS scope)
 Greek Exclusive Economic Zone
 Portuguese Exclusive Economic Zone
 South West Coast of Apulia
 Spanish Exclusive Economic Zone

References

 van der Linden J. & Eikenboom J.C.A. (1992) On the taxonomy of the Recent species of the genus Chrysallida Carpenter from Europe, the Canary Islands and the Azores. Basteria 56: 3-63.
 Peñas A. & Rolán E. (1998). La familia Pyramidellidae Gray, 1840 (Mollusca, Gastropoda) en África Occidental. 3. El género Chrysallida s.l. Iberus, suppl. 4 : 1-73.
 Gofas, S.; Le Renard, J.; Bouchet, P. (2001). Mollusca, in: Costello, M.J. et al. (Ed.) (2001). European register of marine species: a check-list of the marine species in Europe and a bibliography of guides to their identification. Collection Patrimoines Naturels, 50: pp. 180–213 
 Micali P., Nofroni I. & Perna E. (2012) Parthenina alesii n. sp. from Eastern Mediterranean, and notes on Parthenina dantarti (Peñas & Rolán in Peñas, Rolán & Ballesteros, 2008) (Gastropoda: Heterobranchia: Pyramidellidae). Bollettino Malacologico 48(1): 69-72.

External links
 To CLEMAM
 To World Register of Marine Species

Pyramidellidae
Gastropods described in 1872